Dan Sullivan is an American indie rock musician from Chicago, Illinois. He started his musical career with self-titled (albeit mirrored) Folk Rock band Nad Navillus, releasing three albums from March 1999 to November 2002. He was also a member of short lived Post Rock project A-Z Consolidated, releasing one EP.

Dan Sullivan is also known as an occasional guitarist in the Folk Rock band Songs: Ohia. He is currently leading metal band Arriver and also plays in rock band The American Pringles.

Discography

Discography
Arriver, "TSUSHIMA" Bloodlust 170 (released February 2012)
Rabid Rabbit "Czarny Sen" Bloodlust 169 (released January 2012)
Arriver, "Center Down" Nodak 006 split 7-inch (released June 2011)
Arriver, "Simon Mann EP" BecRec (released February 2010)
Arriver, "Vanlandingham and Zone" Proshop (released 2006)
The American Pringles "1968-1970" Proshop (released June 2006)
The American Pringles "The Pringles Are Coming!" ProShop 015 (released June 2005)
The Butchershop Quartet "The Rite of Spring" G4CD7701 (released April 2004)
Nad Navillus "Iron Night" Jag51 (released November 2002)
Nad Navillus "Show Your Face" Jag37 (released November 2001)
A-Z Consolidated s/t ProShop 008 (released October 1999)
Nad Navillus s/t ProShop 005 (released March 1999)
Cockpokalypse "C'est Cockpokalypse" (cassette release 1996)
Cockpokalypse "Big Gun Party Fun" (cassette release 1995)
Yakamashi "Shot Out Your Asshole" (cassette release 1995)
Cockpokalypse "Answer Lies" (cassette release 1993)
Wrektomb s/t (cassette release 1993)
Nad Navillus "On the Ground" (cassette release 1993)

On Other Releases
Dylan Posa and Three Cheers For One Dead Man "Executive Shirts '79/The Nairu Report" 7-inch Northern Varieties NV03 (2006)
Dave LaCrone and the Mistletones "The New Old-Fashioned Way" (December 2003)
Songs: Ohia "The Magnolia Electric Company" SC76 (released February 2003)
Parker Paul "Wingfoot" Jag28 (released October 2001)
Songs: Ohia “Mi Sei Apparso Come Un Fantasma” Paper Cup/White and Black (released September 2001)
Joan of Arse "Distant Hearts A Little Closer" slab4 (released September 2001)
Steve Fanagan "There is Hope" mango010 (released July 2001)
Songs: Ohia/Glen Hansard split 7-inch RR7-006 (released December 2000)
Skeeter Pete & the Sullivan Mountain Boys s/t Bert 012 (released April 2000)

Compilations
An International Compilation "Performance #1" ITC 8 (released July 2002)
Tract Records "Eye of the Beholder II" TR002 (released October 2002)

External links 
Official Nad Navillus website
Official Arriver website

American indie rock musicians
Living people
Musicians from Chicago
Year of birth missing (living people)
Place of birth missing (living people)